Robert Kristian Paolo Sperati (July 27, 1872 – October 12, 1945) was a Norwegian stage actor and film actor from the silent-film era.

Career
Sperati was born in Bergen. He made his debut at the National Theater in Bergen as the aristocrat in Turgenev's Fortune's Fool before he had success as Thummelumsen in Gustav Wied's comedy of the same name and in Anthon B. Nilsen's Bedstemors Gut (Grandma's Boy). He later worked in Oslo, at the Central Theater, the Oslo New Theater, and the Open-Air Theater on Bygdøy. He also participated in the first broadcast of the NRK Radio Theater, in the role of the Bøyg in Henrik Ibsen's Peer Gynt (on September 12, 1926).

Family
Sperati was the son of the conductor Robert Sperati (1848–1884) and the actress Octavia Sperati, and the grandson of the conductor and composer Paolo Sperati. He was married to the author Kitty Lossius. He was the nephew of the composer and music professor Carlo Alberto Sperati.

Filmography
1911: Fattigdommens forbandelse
1911: Hemmeligheden as Halling the landowner
1916: Paria as Carsten, an editor
1917: En Vinternat as a husband
1917: Unge hjerter as a Sami
1918: Vor tids helte as Sam
1926: Den nye lensmannen as Haugkallen

References

External links
 
 Robert Sperati at the Danish Film Database

1872 births
1945 deaths
Norwegian male stage actors
Norwegian male film actors
Norwegian male silent film actors
20th-century Norwegian male actors
Actors from Bergen
Norwegian people of Italian descent